"Lifestyles of the Rich and Famous" is the first single from American hip hop duo Kool G Rap & DJ Polo's 1996 album Rated XXX.

Background
"Lifestyles of the Rich and Famous" is a braggadocio rap in which Kool G Rap boasts of his extravagant lifestyles, success with women and luxurious possessions. The song's hook samples the lines "I'm representin, puttin' Queens on the map" and "Playin' big willie style with the chauffeur. Yaknawmean?" from the Lost Boyz song "Jeeps, Lex Coups, Bimaz & Benz" and Junior M.A.F.I.A.'s "Player's Anthem", respectively. A heavy piano sample from the Fonda Rae song "Over Like a Fat Rat" can also be heard throughout.

Samples
"Lifestyles of the Rich and Famous" samples the following songs:
"Over Like a Fat Rat" by Fonda Rae
"Player's Anthem" by Junior M.A.F.I.A. featuring The Notorious B.I.G.
"Jeeps, Lex Coups, Bimaz & Benz" by Lost Boyz

And was later sampled on:
"The Real Moneymaker" by Bassi Maestro

Track listing

12"
A-side
 "Lifestyles of the Rich and Famous" (Vocal Version) (4:57)
 "Lifestyles of the Rich and Famous" (Dub Version) (4:57)

B-side
 "Lifestyles of the Rich and Famous" (Instrumental Version) (4:57)
 "Lifestyles of the Rich and Famous" (Acapella Version) (3:39)

Cassette
A-side
 "Lifestyles of the Rich and Famous" (Vocal) (4:57)

B-side
 "Lifestyles of the Rich and Famous" (Dub) (4:57)

References

External links
 "Lifestyles of the Rich and Famous" at Discogs

1996 singles
Kool G Rap songs
Songs written by Kool G Rap
1996 songs
Cold Chillin' Records singles